Pauline Lapointe (May 12, 1950 - August 30, 2010) was a Canadian film and television actress and singer from Quebec. She was most noted for her performance in the 1993 film La Florida, for which she garnered a Genie Award nomination for Best Actress at the 14th Genie Awards.

The twin sister of actress Louise Portal, she was born in Chicoutimi, Quebec. She released two albums as a pop singer, Pauline Lapointe (1980) and Je dis oui (1983), before concentrating primarily on acting. Her other film roles included The Handyman (L'Homme à tout faire), Sonatine, The Alley Cat (Le Matou), Cruising Bar, The Ideal Man (L'Homme idéal) and It's Your Turn, Laura Cadieux (C'est à ton tour, Laura Cadieux), while her television roles included Watatatow, L'Obsession and Emma.

She died in 2010 of breast cancer.

References

External links

1950 births
2010 deaths
Canadian film actresses
Canadian television actresses
Canadian women singers
Canadian pop singers
Deaths from cancer in Quebec 
Deaths from breast cancer
French Quebecers
Singers from Quebec
Actresses from Quebec
Musicians from Saguenay, Quebec
French-language singers of Canada
Canadian twins